Maud Russell England (30 December 1863 – 12 May 1956) was a New Zealand teacher, feminist, educationalist and art dealer. She was born in Rugby, Warwickshire, England on 30 December 1863.

References

1863 births
1956 deaths
New Zealand feminists
People from Rugby, Warwickshire
19th-century  New Zealand educators